Ananda Krishnan is an Indian film director working in Tamil cinema. He made his directorial debut with the 2014 thriller Aal and went on to direct the 2016 action crime film Metro, before which he worked as an assistant director with Susi Ganeshan for the 2009 superhero film Kanthaswamy.

Career
Ananda Krishnan began his career as a first assistant director in Kanthaswamy under director Susi Ganeshan and he also worked as a co-editor for editor Praveen K. L. for the same movie.

In 2014, he made his directional debut through Aal. The film was produced by Shoundaryan Pictures. It was an official remake of the Hindi Movie Aamir featuring Vidharth, and Hardika Shetty. He was appreciated by the media for a sensitive issue took in his first film . Critics and cine celebrities have given positive reviews for the film.

In 2016, he produced and directed an action thriller film Metro under his banner Metro Productions.

Personal life
Ananda Krishnan was the son of Arul Mozhi Varman and Rajivee. His brother Dhanraj Rajendran, who works for Wipro in United States had always encouraged him. He studied until 12th grade in St.Patrick Matriculation Higher Secondary School, Pondicherry. Right from his school days, he was inclined towards writing short stories and participated in several speech competitions, which later pulled him to join B.Sc., Visual Communication Course (2006) in The New College, Chennai. He married Shrilekha on 24 August 2017 in Madurai.

Filmography

References

External links
http://m.timesofindia.com/articleshow/18793250.cms
https://web.archive.org/web/20140211164301/http://isikkim.com/2012-12-south-indian-star-vidharths-aal-being-shot-in-sikkim-21-6/
http://behindwoods.com/tamil-movies-cinema-news-10/vidharth-rescued-by-indian-army--vidharth-aalu-25-03-13.html

1987 births
People from Pondicherry
Living people
Tamil film directors
Film directors from Puducherry